Liafu (also Romanized as Līāfū, Leyafoo, and Leyāfū; also known as Leyāfū Doldīm, and Līāfū Doldīm) is a village in Blukat Rural District, Rahmatabad and Blukat District, Rudbar County, Gilan Province, Iran. At the 2006 census, its population was 198, in 51 families.

References 

Populated places in Rudbar County